Isanthrene melas is a moth of the subfamily Arctiinae. It was described by Pieter Cramer in 1775. It is found in Brazil.

References

Moths described in 1775
Euchromiina
Arctiinae of South America
Taxa named by Pieter Cramer